Andreas Alm (born 19 June 1973) is a Swedish football coach in charge of Odense Boldklub from June and a former football player.

He formerly managed AIK and is also a former player for the club. During his active career he played for the two Stockholm rivals AIK and Hammarby IF in the Swedish Allsvenskan. He also played for IFK Norrköping in the Swedish Superettan and also in Norway and Kongsvinger IL for a short time.

Commentating job
After his active career he showed up in Swedish television as a football commentator in the national channel TV4.

Managerial career

AIK
On 27 November 2008 he was appointed as a new assistant manager for AIK following the departure of former assistant Nebojša Novaković earlier the same month in protest against the board’s decision to sack Rikard Norling. Together with other assistant manager Christer Swärd and manager Mikael Stahre, AIK managed to win both Allsvenskan and Svenska Cupen during their first year together.

The following year, AIK started by winning the Supercupen against the recent league runners-up IFK Göteborg. But the rest of the season became a big disappointment, and Stahre left the club for Greek outfit Panionios G.S.S. in April 2010. Alm remained as assistant manager during caretaker Björn Wesström's stay and later appointed Alex Miller's stay. When Miller and AIK during mutual consent split up, Alm later on was appointed as AIK's new manager in December 2010. Novaković rejoined the team staff as assistant manager together with Swärd.

Alm became a successful coach for AIK and ended on the second place in both 2011 and 2013 in the Allsvenskan.

Vejle Boldklub
Alm was linked with a job at the vacant job at Brøndby IF in May 2016, but was instead presented as the new manager of Vejle Boldklub 2 months later.

After a disappointing season, finishing on the 9th place, Alm confirmed on 30 May 2017, that he wouldn't continue as the head coach of Vejle.

BK Häcken
Alm was appointed as the head coach of BK Häcken on 8 December 2017, which is his second stint as coach in Allsvenskan.

Honours

Manager
BK Häcken
Swedish Cup: 2018–19

Managerial statistics

References

External links
  (archive)
 
 

1973 births
Living people
Swedish football managers
AIK Fotboll managers
Swedish footballers
IFK Norrköping players
Kongsvinger IL Toppfotball players
AIK Fotboll players
Hammarby Fotboll players
Allsvenskan players
Eliteserien players
Swedish expatriate football managers
Expatriate footballers in Norway
Swedish expatriate sportspeople in Norway
Association football forwards
Swedish expatriate footballers
Allsvenskan managers